Víctor Hugo Andrada Canalis (born 25 December 1958 in Santa Fe), nicknamed Copito, is an Argentine football manager and former player who played as a midfielder.

Club career
In his native country he played professional football for Colón de Santa Fe, Gimnasia y Esgrima de La Plata, Racing Club de Avellaneda and Unión de Santa Fe, but the neighbouring country of Bolivia is where he spent most of his extensive career, playing for teams such as, Blooming, The Strongest, San José, Destroyers and Real Potosí. He also made a short spell in the Liga Chilena de Fútbol with Unión Española.

Managerial career
Following his retirement, "Copito" pursued a career as a football manager in Bolivia. In 2005, he took over club Real Potosí, but he was sacked due to poor results. In 2007, he made his comeback with Nacional Potosí, but the team fell short from winning the promotion after losing in a two-game series to Guabirá. Nevertheless, Andrada got his recognition in 2008 as he took the team back to the Copa Simón Bolivar finals; only this time, his team came victorious. Therefore, gained promotion to the Liga de Fútbol Profesional Boliviano for the first time in the club's history. The next year Andrada had an explosive start in first division with Nacional, leading the standings during the first ten weeks; however, the team began to stagger and eventually fell behind. On June 14, 2009, after 18 games into the season, Andrada resigned from his job in protest to constant intrusion of the board of directors in team affairs. On July 6, 2009 he assumed his managerial duties with Blooming, where he won the national league title of Clausura 2009, defeating Bolívar in the final match.

References

External links
 Víctor Hugo Andrada – Argentine Primera statistics at Fútbol XXI  
 
 Víctor Hugo Andrada: "El fútbol necesita formadores" 
 

1958 births
Living people
Footballers from Santa Fe, Argentina
Argentine footballers
Bolivian footballers
Bolivian expatriate footballers
Argentine expatriate footballers
Association football midfielders
Racing Club de Avellaneda footballers
Club Atlético Colón footballers
Club de Gimnasia y Esgrima La Plata footballers
Unión de Santa Fe footballers
Club Blooming players
Club San José players
The Strongest players
Unión Española footballers
Club Destroyers players
Club Real Potosí players
Expatriate footballers in Chile
Argentine football managers
Bolivian football managers
Independiente Petrolero managers
Club Real Potosí managers
Nacional Potosí managers
Club Blooming managers
C.D. Jorge Wilstermann managers
C.D. Real Tomayapo managers
Club Deportivo Guabirá managers
C.D. Palmaflor del Trópico managers
Argentine expatriate sportspeople in Bolivia
Argentine expatriate sportspeople in Ecuador
Expatriate football managers in Bolivia
Expatriate football managers in Ecuador
Royal Pari F.C. managers
Mushuc Runa S.C. managers